Prince Toma Vučić Perišić (Serbian Cyrillic: Тома Вучић Перишић; 1787 – 13 July 1859) was a Serbian politician, military leader during the Serbian Revolution, Freemason and one of the most powerful and influential individuals in Serbia of the 19th century. He was Miloš Obrenović's most virulent opponent, and an ally of the Karađorđević Dynasty with Avram Petronijević and Ilija Garašanin and other so-called Constitutionalists (Dimitrije Davidović, Aleksa Simić, Stojan Simić, Milutin Savić). He wanted to bring rule of law and an effective administrative system in the Principality of Serbia, if only foreign interference was not an issue. Eventually, in the political tug-of-war, the constitutionalists period came to an abrupt end with the former absolute ruler reclaiming the throne.

He married twice, first time with Perunika Žabarac and second wife Agnija nicknamed Nula, sister of a Greek revolutionary leader of the Greek War of Independence, Yiannis Pharmakis. With his first wife he had four children, two daughters (Stanka and Anka) and two sons (Stevan and Ilija). According to some sources, Vučić dug out his own eye with a fork during a lunch, because he had an eye pain.

A street in Belgrade is named after him.

See also
 List of Serbian Revolutionaries

References 

1787 births
1859 deaths
Politicians from Belgrade
People from Obrenovac
People of the Second Serbian Uprising
Serbian military leaders
Serbian revolutionaries
19th-century Serbian people
Military personnel from Belgrade
Defence ministers of Serbia
Interior ministers of Serbia